John Stone (born John Hailstone; 26 May 1924 – 2007) was a Welsh actor.

Career
Born in Cardiff, Glamorgan, Wales, Stone was educated at Brighton College. He served in the R.A.F. and began his career as a journalist. Soon he switched to acting and only appeared on the stage until 1945 when he joined the B.B.C. Repertory Company. He made his first West End appearance in One Wild Oat by Vernon Sylvaine, 1948. Subsequent appearances include the London premiere of Arthur Miller's A View from the Bridge, Comedy Theatre, 1956; And Suddenly it's Spring, Duke of York's Theatre, 1959; Signpost to Murder, Cambridge Theatre, 1962; and the role of Crestwell, the laconic butler, in Noël Coward's Relative Values, Westminster Theatre, 1973.

Under contract to Rank, as one of the Sydney Box Company of Youth ("Charm School") in the late 1940s. Film credits include The Weaker Sex (dir. Roy Baker), 1948; The Frightened City, 1961; Masque of the Red Death (dir. Roger Corman), 1964; Deadlier Than the Male (1967); and You Only Live Twice (1967).

Stone was a familiar face on British television from the 1950s-1980s, and featured as Captain John Dillon in Quatermass II (1955). In 1957, he starred as special agent, Mike Anson, in an early ITV thriller series, Destination Downing Street (Associated Rediffusion), which ran for 26 weeks. From 1971 to 1974 Stone played Dr Ian Moody in the Yorkshire Television series, Justice, opposite Margaret Lockwood, his offscreen partner of seventeen years. Subsequently, he appeared in the BBC series, Flesh and Blood (1980–82) and Strike it Rich (1986/87).

Under his birth name of John Hailstone, he wrote A Present for the Past, a play premiered at the Royal Lyceum Theatre, Edinburgh, as part of the Edinburgh International Festival of 1966. It starred Wendy Hiller, Renee Asherson, and Gwen Ffrangcon-Davies, and was produced by Michael Codron.

Personal life

He married the actress Lian-Shin Yang in 1958. She died in 1970.

Filmography

References

External links
 
 The John Stone Collection is held by the Victoria and Albert Museum Theatre and Performance Department.

1924 births
2007 deaths
Welsh male film actors
Welsh male stage actors
Male actors from Cardiff
Date of death missing
Place of death missing
Royal Air Force personnel of World War II